Jimmy Filerman (born November 11, 1996) is an American soccer player.

Career

Youth, college and amateur
Filerman attended Oakton High School, earning All-District, All-Region and All-Metro honors in his senior year, also landing on the All-State Second Team. Filerman was also a member of the D.C. United academy for five years.

In 2015, Filerman attended Old Dominion University to play college soccer. He redshirted his freshman season, before going on to play four seasons, scoring six goals and tallying eight assists. He was named second-team All-Conference USA in his senior year.

While at college, Filerman appeared in the USL League Two, playing with Cincinnati Dutch Lions in 2018, and Seattle Sounders U-23 in 2019.

Professional
In August 2020, Filerman signed with NISA club Detroit City FC, going on to make six regular season appearances. On February 16, 2021, Filerman signed with USL League One club FC Tucson. However, he didn't play with Tucson, later re-signing with Detroit City for the latter parts of the 2021 season, going on to earn earning NISA All-League Second Team honors.
 
On January 27, 2022, Filerman signed with USL League One club ahead of their 2022 season. He debuted for Greenville on April 7, 2022, appearing as a 69th–minute substitute during a 2–0 US Open Cup win over Oakland Roots. Following the 2022 season, his contract option was declined by Greenville.

References

External links 
 
 Soccerway profile

1996 births
Living people
American soccer players
Association football defenders
Cincinnati Dutch Lions players
Detroit City FC players
Greenville Triumph SC players
National Independent Soccer Association players
People from Vienna, Virginia
Seattle Sounders FC U-23 players
Soccer players from Virginia
FC Tucson players
USL League Two players
USL League One players